CPW may refer to:

ST Kinetics CPW, a submachine gun
Camp Project Wales, a youth project for disadvantaged children run by the United Reformed Church in the 1970s and 1980s
Central Park West, an avenue in Manhattan
Central Park West (TV series), a short-lived U.S. television drama in the mid-90s
Central Plains Water Enhancement Scheme, an irrigation proposal for Canterbury, New Zealand
Commercial Processing Workload, a server benchmarking tool from IBM
Colorado Parks and Wildlife, a division of the Colorado Department of Natural Resources
Conquer Pro Wrestling, a wrestling promotion
Coplanar waveguide, a type of printed electrical transmission line
Cumberland Plain Woodland, an ecological community in Sydney, Australia
Customer premises wiring, customer-owned communications transmission lines
The stock market symbol for The Carphone Warehouse